The Passaic Formation is a mapped bedrock unit in Pennsylvania, New Jersey, and New York. It was previously known as the Brunswick Formation since it was first described in the vicinity of New Brunswick, New Jersey. It is now named for the city of Passaic, New Jersey, which is near where its type section was described by paleontologist Paul E. Olsen.

Description
The Passaic is defined as a reddish-brown shale, siltstone and mudstone with a few green and brown shale interbeds; red and dark-gray interbedded argillites near the base. In New Jersey, there are conglomerate and sandstone beds within the formation.

Depositional environment
The Passaic is mostly shallow lakes, playa, and alluvial fan deposits resulting from the rifting of Pangea. The red color is often evidence that the sediments were deposited in arid conditions. The Passaic Formation overlies the Lockatong Formation deep lake sediment cycles, which were deposited during wetter climatic cycles during the Late Triassic. These sediments came from the northwest and contain clasts from Appalachian formations.

Fossils
Clepsysaurus
Hypsognathus fenneri

Age
The Passaic is Late Triassic with an astronomically calibrated age of 219 to 201.7 million years ago (Ma) and is about 13,000 ft (~4 km) thick in the basin depocenter. It conformably overlies the Lockatong Formation (darker, generally gray shales and mudrocks) and is overlain by the first Watching(Orange Mountain Formation) basalt. The Triassic/Jurassic boundary and correlated by pollen is located in the uppermost part of the formation, ~ 2 precessional cycles (~10-12 m) below the Orange Mountain Basalt. There are numerous diabase intrusions into the Passaic with local contact metamorphic rocks.

References

See also 
 Geology of Pennsylvania
 Geology of New Jersey

Geologic formations of New Jersey
Geologic formations of New York (state)
Geologic formations of Pennsylvania
Shale formations of the United States
Mudstone formations
Siltstone formations
Paleontology in New Jersey
Paleontology in New York (state)
Paleontology in Pennsylvania
Triassic System of North America
Triassic geology of New Jersey
Triassic geology of New York (state)
Triassic geology of Pennsylvania